Jungle Racing is a Mayan-themed roller coaster located at Happy Valley Beijing, Beijing, China. It is a mine train roller coaster manufactured by Vekoma.

References

Happy Valley (amusement parks)
Roller coasters in China